Maninder Singh is an Indian actor. He played Indian independence activist Ananta Singh in the film Khelein Hum Jee Jaan Sey (2010). He played the lead role in the suspense thriller television show 2612 (2012) as Randeep Rathore and reprised the same role in the next season titled as 2613. In 2014, he was also seen in the popular television show C.I.D.  portraying senior CID cop. He was also seen in Zee TV's Sanyukt. He was last seen in Star Bharat's Kya Haal, Mr. Paanchal?.

Filmography

Films

Television

Awards

References

External links
 

Indian male television actors
Male actors in Hindi television
Male actors in Hindi cinema
1980 births
Living people